Lake Dem is a small lake in northern Burkina Faso, located to the north of Kaya, south of the Sahel Reserve and south-east of Lake Bam. It drains into the White Volta. It is 5 km long and 2 km wide. It lies at an elevation of 304 m (997 feet). The lake has been designated as a Ramsar site since 2009.

See also

References

Dem
Ramsar sites in Burkina Faso